William Seel Building is a historic commercial building located at Harrisburg, Dauphin County, Pennsylvania.  It was built in 1912–1913, and is a narrow four-story, four bay wide office building built of brownstone and brick.  It features two elegant arches at the first floor and an overhanging cornice.

It was added to the National Register of Historic Places in 1980.

References

Buildings and structures in Harrisburg, Pennsylvania
Commercial buildings on the National Register of Historic Places in Pennsylvania
Commercial buildings completed in 1913
1913 establishments in Pennsylvania
National Register of Historic Places in Harrisburg, Pennsylvania